Andrzej Adamek (born January 6, 1972 in Wałbrzych, Lower Silesia, Poland) is a former Polish professional basketball player. He is one of the current assistant coaches of the Śląsk Wrocław of the Polish Basketball League.

Early career

He began playing basketball in his home town. In 1995–96 he moved to the Polonia Przemyśl. With this team he achieved a Polish vice-championship. In 1998 he came back to Lower Silesia and played in Zepter Idea Śląsk Wrocław. The main reasons why he left Polonia Przemyśl were their financial problems and worse position in the league. In Wrocław he did not belong to the most important players, he did not stand out. He did not even appear on the bench very often. During the 1999–00 season after talks with the Slask's authorities he decided to move to the Kielce. However this step was not the best solution for Adamek. He still played rarely. From Kielce he moved to the Prokom Trefl Sopot. The beginning of the season was successful for him. He played regularly. But when the Prokom's activist hired Igor Miličić everything changed. "Szkopek" had big difficulties with his place in the team again. In 2002 he came back to Wrocław and played for Idea Śląsk Wrocław. In 2003 he decided to play abroad; he chose Swedish league. In 2004 he returned to his hometown and started to play and coach Górnik Wałbrzych. He retired definitely in 2005. He coached Górnik Wałbrzych in First Polish League (actually First Polish League is the second after the PLK). He has made a contribution to remain his team in First Polish League. In 2006 he was assistant coach in Śląsk Wrocław Adamek also has spent a short while as head coach of the Śląsk Wrocław.He took over the team when the management were looking for a new coach. He was a temporary head coach but he had a chance to show his skills in ULEB Cup.In the 2008–2009 season he began as assistant coach in Śląsk Wrocław. However - after the financial problems - Śląsk Wrocław was withdrawn from PLK. Adamek received an offer from the Górnik Wałbrzych and decided to take over the team.  Because of the financial problems in Górnik, Adamek has moved to the Turów Zgorzelec where he is working as assistant coach of Paweł Turkiewicz. As assistant coach in Turów he has advanced to the national finals.

Professional career
Andrzej Adamek was a multiple PLK champion with Śląsk Wrocław. He also was a runner-up with Polonia Przemyśl. Moreover, he performed for Polish national basketball team.

Coaching career
He belongs to one of the most perspective coaches of young generation in Poland. In 2006–07 he was an assistant coach in Senior Polish national basketball team helping head coach Andrej Urlep. He was an assistant coach of the Polish Basketball National Team during the EuroBasket 2007 in Spain. In 2009, he was a runner-up as the Turów Zgorzelec assistant coach. In 2010, Adamek won the championship with Asseco Prokom Gdynia as the assistant coach. In 2012, he won his first championship as the head coach.

External links 
 Polskikosz.pl
 E-basket.pl

Living people
1972 births
Arka Gdynia basketball coaches
Asseco Gdynia players
Czarni Słupsk players
People from Wałbrzych
Polish men's basketball players
Śląsk Wrocław basketball players
Sportspeople from Lower Silesian Voivodeship
Znicz Pruszków players